U218 Singles is a greatest hits album by Irish rock band U2, released in November 2006. In most markets, the album contains 18 songs: 16 of their most successful and popular singles, and two new songs. The 17th track is a cover version of the Skids' "The Saints Are Coming", recorded with Green Day to benefit Hurricane Katrina charities. The 18th and closing track was a new song entitled "Window in the Skies". In some markets such as the United Kingdom, an extra song, "I Will Follow", was included as the opening track. A DVD compilation of music videos from throughout the group's career entitled U218 Videos was released concurrent to U218 Singles.

The album debuted on the Billboard 200 albums chart on 9 December 2006 at number 12 with sales of 134,000 copies. It spent 45 weeks on the chart. Despite not being released until November 2006, it was the seventh-highest-selling album in the world that year.

Artwork and packaging 
The art direction and design for U218 Singles was handled by Shaughn McGrath. Many different photographs were used in the album's packaging with front and back cover photographs taken by David Corio and Anton Corbijn, respectively with booklet photographs by Corbijn, Paul Slattery, Andrew McPherson, Colm Henry, Matt Mahurin, Pennie Smith, and Sheila Rock.

Track listing

No songs from October (1981), Zooropa (1993), Pop (1997), or the Passengers (U2 & Brian Eno) project Original Soundtracks 1 (1995) are included.

Variations
A limited edition version includes a live DVD featuring ten songs recorded on the Vertigo Tour in Milan. "I Will Follow" appears as a bonus track on UK and Australian editions of the CD. The deluxe version in the UK, Ireland, and Canadian iTunes Stores also contains nine of the live songs from the limited edition bonus disc as audio tracks, as well as a digital booklet and a bonus track, "Smile," for those who pre-ordered the album. The United States deluxe iTunes version does not come with a digital booklet, but instead with "Smile" as a bonus track even if it was not pre-ordered.

Vertigo 05: Live from Milan DVD

Vertigo 05: Live from Milan is a concert film included as a bonus DVD in the deluxe edition of U218 Singles. The DVD features ten songs from the band's 25-song concert on 21 July 2005 in Milan, Italy, during the Vertigo Tour. It is U2's second concert release from the tour, preceded by Vertigo 2005: Live from Chicago and followed by U2 3D. On the iTunes Store deluxe edition of the album, these songs are featured as bonus audio tracks, except for "Original of the Species", which was later released as an iTunes Store exclusive single.

Track listing
"Vertigo"
"I Will Follow"
"Elevation"
"I Still Haven't Found What I'm Looking For"
"All I Want Is You"
"City of Blinding Lights"
"Sometimes You Can't Make It on Your Own"
"Miss Sarajevo"
"Original of the Species"
"With or Without You"

Audio
PCM Stereo
Dolby Digital 5.1
DTS 5.1

Charts

Weekly charts

Year-end charts

Decade-end charts

Certifications and sales

References

Albums produced by Steve Lillywhite
Albums produced by Daniel Lanois
Albums produced by Brian Eno
Albums produced by Jacknife Lee
Albums produced by Rick Rubin
U2 compilation albums
U2 video albums
2006 video albums
Live video albums
2006 greatest hits albums
Interscope Records compilation albums
Interscope Records live albums
Interscope Records video albums
U2 live albums
Mercury Records compilation albums
Mercury Records live albums
Mercury Records video albums
Films directed by Hamish Hamilton (director)